Tariq Mohammad Mir has served as a career diplomat in the Pakistan Foreign Service. He served as Ambassador in Sri Lanka, Iraq and Head of Mission in Iran in 1978, 1980, and 1981. He began his career in the Pakistan Army and rose to the rank of Brigadier. He  later transferred into the civil service.

He obtained his early education from the Prince of Wales Royal Indian Military College.  He attended the Staff College at Camberley in the United Kingdom, and  specialized training in Diplomacy at The Fletcher School of Law and Diplomacy at Tufts University in Medford, Massachusetts. He is also a graduate of the Infantry School, Ft. Benning and the  Command and  General Staff College, Ft. Leavenworth, USA.

He hails from a well known judicial family of Kasur in Punjab. His grandfather Khan Bahadur Moula Baksh retired as a District and sessions judge. The late Khan Bahadur had an impressive collection of law books that he donated to various institutions in Lahore that are in use even today. His father Mr. S.M. Mir BA Cantab Bar-at-Law also served as District and Sessions Judge and later was appointed as Prime Minister in the princely state of Tonk.  The Late S.M. Mir introduced important reforms in the state and helped under privileged students to avail higher studies by providing state scholarships.

During his army career in 1965 he commanded a battalion in Bagh sector Azad Jammu and Kashmir (AJK) and in 1971 during the Indo-Pak war he commanded an infantry brigade and received many commendations for setting a personal example of leading his troops and for his exemplary conduct in securing the strategic objectives entrusted to him (2)

Tariq Mir served as head of the Pakistani mission during the historic Iranian revolution. Through his efforts Pakistan became the first country to recognize the new regime on February 11, 1979, reciprocating the Iranian gesture of being the first country to recognize the newly established state of Pakistan in 1947.

During the first Gulf War while Ambassador in Iraq he helped in the successful and safe evacuation of thousands of Pakistanis displaced from Kuwait. While Ambassador in Sri Lanka he was able to greatly strengthen bilateral as well as trade ties. During his tenure a series of high level exchange of visits took place. Both the President and Prime Minister of Sri Lanka visited Pakistan while the President of Pakistan paid a state visit to Sri Lanka. As the head of delegation at the Colombo Plan countries meeting in Australia he was able to successfully advocate the need for greater north south technical collaboration.

For meritorious services rendered to his country, he has been awarded the Tamgha-e-Pakistan and the Sitara-e-Imtiaz. The Government of Iran conferred upon him the award of Nishan-e-Humayun.

Until recently he has been associated with the Pakistan Foreign Service Academy where he has taught courses to Pakistani and international diplomats.

References

2. Hilal Magazine December 2014 www.ISPR.gov.pk

Living people
Year of birth missing (living people)
High Commissioners of Pakistan to Sri Lanka
Ambassadors of Pakistan to Iraq
Ambassadors of Pakistan to Iran
Pakistan Army officers